Niccolò Carissa (born 1730, date of death unknown)  was an Italian painter who produced several still-life paintings of flowers, vegetables, and birds. He worked in Rome and Naples.

References

1730 births
Year of death unknown
18th-century Italian painters
Italian male painters
Italian still life painters
Italian Baroque painters
Painters from Naples
18th-century Italian male artists